Clinical test may refer to:
Diagnostic test
Clinical trial